Black Prince was a cruise ship, owned and operated by Fred. Olsen Cruise Lines. She was built in 1966 by the Lübecker Flender-Werke in Lübeck, West Germany for Fred. Olsen Lines for combined ferry/cruise ship operations. From 1970 until 1983 she sailed the northern hemisphere summer seasons on ferry service for Det Bergenske Dampskibsselskab as Venus, while returning to cruise service with Fred. Olsen for the winter seasons. In 1983 the summer ferry service was taken over by DFDS, and in 1985 it passed to Norway Line. In 1986 Fred. Olsen bought the ship outright and she was converted to a full-time cruise ship, retaining the name Black Prince.

Black Prince was retired from the Fred. Olsen fleet on 16 October 2009. Although her withdrawal was reportedly due to the new SOLAS 2010 regulations, she was sold to SAVECA for further cruise service in Venezuelan waters under the name Ola Esmeralda. SAVECA planned to use the ship for cruises between islands within Venezuelan waters, also as a floating hotel. She was scrapped at Santo Domingo, Dominican Republic in October 2013.

References

External links
Fed. Olsen Cruise Lines official website for Black Prince

 

Cruise ships of Norway
Cruiseferries
Ships built in Lübeck
1966 ships